The Timișel is a right tributary of the river Gladna in Romania. It flows into the Gladna near Jupani. In Mănăștiur part of its flow is redirected towards the Bega.

References

Rivers of Romania
Rivers of Timiș County